Caroline Robbins or Caroline Herben (18 August 1903 – 8 February 1999) was a British historian who was a professor at Bryn Mawr College.

Life
Robbins was born in Middlesex in 1903. Her parents were Rowland Richard (1872–1960) and Rosa Marion Robbins (nee Harris).  Her father was a farmer and he was a Councillor on the Middlesex County Council. Her brother, Lionel, would become an economist.

She took her doctorate at London University with a treatise on Andrew Marvell. Robbins became an instructor in British history at Bryn Mawr College in 1929. She served in that department for 42 years.  She wrote The Eighteenth Century Commonwealthman in 1959.

She married Stephen J. Herben Jr., who was also a professor at Bryn Mawr, in 1932. Robbins died in Valley Forge, Pennsylvania in 1999. After she died a professorship was founded in her name.

Works
 The Eighteenth-Century Commonwealthman: Studies in the Transmission, Development and Circumstances of English Liberal Thought from the Restoration of Charles II until the War with the Thirteen Colonies. Harvard University Press, Cambridge MA 1959.
 Two English Republican Tracts. Cambridge University Press, 1969.
 Barbara Taft: Absolute Liberty: A Selection from the Articles and Papers of Caroline Robbins. Archon Books, Hamden CN 1982.

References 

1903 births
1999 deaths
People from Middlesex
20th-century British historians
British women historians
Herben family
20th-century British women writers
British emigrants to the United States